is a subway station on the Toei Asakusa Line, operated by the Tokyo Metropolitan Bureau of Transportation. It is located in Shinagawa, Tokyo, Japan. Its number is A-04.

Station layout
Togoshi has one platform serving two tracks. Platform 1 is for passengers traveling toward Nishi-magome Station. Platform 2 serves those heading toward  and Oshiage Stations.

History
Togoshi opened on November 15, 1968, as a station on Toei Line 1. In 1978, the line took its present name.

From 1927 to 1936, Shimo-Shimmei Station on the Tōkyū Ōimachi Line had the name Togoshi Station.

Surrounding area
The station serves the Togoshi neighborhood. Nearby are Togoshi-Ginza Station on the Tōkyū Ikegami Line, the Togoshi Ginza shopping district, and Hoshi University.

Railway stations in Japan opened in 1968
Railway stations in Tokyo
Toei Asakusa Line